Mount Pratt is the northernmost nunatak in the Grosvenor Mountains, standing just east of the head of Mill Stream Glacier, 17 nautical miles (31 km) north of Block Peak. Discovered by Rear Admiral Richard Evelyn Byrd on the Byrd Antarctic Expedition flight to the South Pole in November 1929, and named by him for Thomas B. Pratt, American financier and contributor to the expedition.

Nunataks of the Ross Dependency
Dufek Coast